Pumi may refer to:
Pumi people,  ethnic group in China
Pumi language, Tibeto-Burman language used by the Pumi people
Pumi (dog), medium-small herding dog